Nynäshamns IF is a sports club in Nynäshamn, Sweden, established on 4 February 1917. It became an alliance club on 1 January 1989. The men's bandy team played in the Swedish top division during the season of 1972–1972.

The men's soccer team played in the Swedish second division during the seasons of 1939–1940 and 1940–1941.

References

External links
Official website (soccer)
Official website (ice hockey)
Official website (skiing)

1917 establishments in Sweden
Ski clubs in Sweden
Defunct bandy clubs in Sweden
Football clubs in Stockholm County
Ice hockey teams in Sweden
Sport in Nynäshamn
Sports clubs established in 1917
Swedish handball clubs
Ice hockey teams in Stockholm County
Multi-sport clubs in Sweden